Gordon Vivian Elton Hazlewood was the Dean of Barbados from 1951 until 1971. 

He was educated at Codrington College and ordained in 1916. After  curacies  at  Kingstown and  Carriacou he was the Rector of Rivière Dorée until his appointment as Dean.

References

University of the West Indies alumni
Saint Peter, Barbados
Saint Philip, Barbados
Deans of Barbados
Archdeacons of Barbados